George X (Georgian: გიორგი X, Giorgi X) (c. 1561 – 7 September 1606), of the Bagrationi royal dynasty, was a king of the eastern Georgian kingdom of Kartli from 1599 until his death.

Life
George was the eldest son of Simon I of Kartli and his wife, Nestan-Darejan of Kakheti. George fought alongside his father against the Ottoman occupation forces since 1598. He held power after Simon was taken captive by the Turks at the Battle of Nakhiduri in 1599. George attempted several times, though vainly, to ransom his father (who would die as a prisoner in 1612) from captivity and even offered to the Sublime Porte his son as hostage. He soon returned to his struggle against the Ottomans and recovered Lorri in 1601. In 1602, when the Safavid shah of Persia Abbas I resumed a war against the Ottomans, George sided with the Persians and led the Georgian auxiliary troops which took part in the conquest of Erivan in 1603/1604. As a reward, Abbas I granted Giorgi X a minor possession in Iran. In exchange, the shah asked for an area in the Debed River valley in the strategic Lorri district. Abbas I populated this territory with members of the Turkmen tribe Borchali. Finally, the Shah permitted Giorgi X to return to Kartli.

He was the first king of Kartli who attempted to establish diplomatic ties with the northern co-religionist power of Muscovy. George decided even to give his daughter Elene to the Czar Boris Godunov in marriage. However, unstable political situation in both countries terminated these contacts.

According to Georgian chronicles, George X died suddenly, from a sting on his tongue, after biting into a cake with a bee in it, at Mejvriskhevi, 1606. There have also been some speculations that the king was poisoned on the orders of the Persian Shah Abbas I. He was buried at Mtskheta.

Family
George married on 15 September 1578, Mariam (Tamar) (died c. 1614), daughter of Giorgi I Lipartiani, of the Dadiani dynasty. Their children were:
Luarsab II (1592-1622, r. 1606-1615), King of Kartli.
David (born c. 1595), who disappeared while on a mission to rescue Simon I from the Turkish captivity. 
Elene (1591-?), affianced to Feodor II of Russia.
Khorashan (died 1658), second wife of Teimuraz I of Kakheti.
Tinatin (Lela; known as Fatma Sultan Begum and possibly as Gulchara in Iran) was given in marriage in 1604 to Shah Abbas I, who divorced her after the execution of her brother Luarsab II and married her of to Paykar Khān Igīrmī Dūrt, Khan of Barda and governor of Kakheti (1620–1625).

References

Sources

External links
Giorgi X (In Georgian)

Kings of Kartli
Bagrationi dynasty of the Kingdom of Kartli
1560s births
1606 deaths
Eastern Orthodox monarchs
Burials at Svetitskhoveli Cathedral
16th-century people of Safavid Iran
17th-century people of Safavid Iran